River Lyde may refer to:

 River Lyde, Buckinghamshire
 River Lyde, Hampshire